Anya Jabour is an American historian and Regents Professor of History at the University of Montana.
She is known for her works on history of family and U.S. women's history.
Jabour received the Helen and Winston Cox Award for Excellence in Teaching in 2000.

Books
Sophonisba Breckinridge: Championing Women's Activism in Modern America, University of Illinois Press, 2019
Topsy-Turvy: How the Civil War Turned the World Upside Down for Southern Children, Ivan R. Dee, 2010
Family Values in the Old South, University Press of Florida, 2010
Scarlett's Sisters: Young Women in the Old South, University of North Carolina Press, 2007
Major Problems in the History of American Families and Children, Houghton Mifflin Co., 2005
Marriage in the Early Republic: Elizabeth and William Wirt and the Companionate Ideal, Johns Hopkins University Press, 1998

References

External links
Jabour's personal website

American historians
University of Montana faculty
Living people
Rice University alumni
Oberlin College alumni
Women's historians
Year of birth missing (living people)